Ocrasa is a genus of moths belonging to the family Pyralidae. The genus is mostly treated as a synonym of Hypsopygia. If considered valid, the genus includes many species which were formerly included in Herculia. In addition, the proposed genus Orthopygia, which some authors consider a separate (and sometimes monotypic) lineage is here merged with Ocrasa. The latter two genera are also mostly merged with Hypsopygia however.

Selected species
 Ocrasa acerasta
 Ocrasa albidalis Walker, [1866]
 Ocrasa chytriodes (Turner, 1911)
 Ocrasa decoloralis (Lederer, 1863)
 Ocrasa fulvocilialis – sometimes still in Herculia
 Ocrasa glaucinalis – sometimes in Orthopygia
 Ocrasa nannodes – sometimes in Orthopygia
 Ocrasa nostralis (Guenée, 1854)
 Ocrasa placens – sometimes in Orthopygia
 Ocrasa repetita (Butler, 1887)
 Ocrasa tripartialis (Herrich-Schäffer, 1871)

Footnotes

References

  (2009): Markku Savela's Lepidoptera and some other life forms – Ocrasa. Version of 2009-APR-08. Retrieved 2010-APR-12.

Pyralinae
Pyralidae genera